Metung is a town in East Gippsland region of Victoria, Australia.

Metung Post Office opened on 2 June 1879.

Metung is a popular holiday spot, near to larger towns but off any main routes itself. Many of the permanent inhabitants commute to work at Bairnsdale or Lakes Entrance.

Golfers play at the course of the Kings Cove Metung Golf Club on Kings Cove Boulevard.

Legend Rock
The original inhabitants of the area—the Aboriginal Gunai or Kurnai people—tell a story about an unusual group of rocks now found alongside the boardwalk in the Metung Marina on Bancroft Bay. This legend or fable indicates how greed will be punished.

The legend goes that some fishermen made a good catch and ate the fish around their campfire. The fishermen, however, did not share their catch with their dogs, despite having more than enough to eat. As a punishment, the women, who were guardians of social law, turned the greedy men to stone.

Originally there were three rocks found at this location that related to the legend, but two of them were destroyed during road works. The remaining Legend Rock is now protected.

Gallery

References

External links
 Official East Gippsland tourism website

Coastal towns in Victoria (Australia)
Towns in Victoria (Australia)
Shire of East Gippsland